Lady Quark is a fictional character, a superheroine in the DC Universe. In the DC Comics 12-issue limited series Crisis on Infinite Earths (1985-1986), the character was one of the rulers of Earth-Six, which was ruled by royalty. In 2011 introduction of The New 52 DC Multiverse, she and her husband Lord Volt are now the monarchs of Earth 48, which appears to be a modern analogue of Earth-Six in the original DC multiverse.

Fictional character biography

Crisis
Lady Quark comes from Earth-Six, where the American Revolutionary War was not won by the Thirteen Colonies and where technology has become more advanced than Earth-One. Lady Quark, her husband Karak ("Lord Volt"), and daughter Liana ("Princess Fern") make up the royal family that rules Earth-6. While Lord Volt and Princess Fern are both killed when Earth-Six is destroyed during the Crisis, Lady Quark is saved at the last minute by Pariah, a dimensional traveler. Lady Quark helps most of the multiverse's surviving heroes and they journey to the Dawn of Time to battle the Anti-Monitor. After the Crisis is over, Lady Quark resettles on Earth with Pariah and the Harbinger.

Missing her husband, Lady Quark approaches Will Payton with the idea of having him become her consort in Starman #8 (March 1989), but Payton rejects her advances.

L.E.G.I.O.N.
Lady Quark is eventually recruited by Vril Dox to become a member of the peace-keeping force L.E.G.I.O.N. in L.E.G.I.O.N. '90 #18. Lady Quark is apparently killed in L.E.G.I.O.N. '94 #62 after a parasitic shapeshifter absorbs her memories and powers. The shapeshifter replaces her in L.E.G.I.O.N., but later dies in L.E.G.I.O.N. '94 #70. Lady Quark's corpse is later seen floating in space, heavily maimed.

Return
Eleven years later, Lady Quark returns alive and well without explanation in Villains United #5 (2005), in which she is captured by Sinestro at the request of Alexander Luthor, Jr. She is imprisoned in Luthor's tower as part of his plan to bring the core Earths of the Multiverse back into existence. Lady Quark is later freed and joins Earth's heroes in defeating Luthor in Infinite Crisis (2005-2006).

Lady Quark appears again in several splash pages of Tales of the Sinestro Corps: Superman-Prime (December 2007), and again in a double page spread of Legionnaires and characters associated with the Legion of Super-Heroes in Final Crisis: Legion of 3 Worlds #5 (July 2009).

The New 52
In The New 52 2011 reboot of Vibe, Lady Quark is revealed to be one of Amanda Waller's and A.R.G.U.S's interdimensional prisoners. Vibe releases Lady Quark, along with Gypsy, Pariah, and several other formerly absent characters, and the former prisoners begin to attack Amanda Waller and A.R.G.U.S.

Multiversity: Earth-48
In Grant Morrison's Multiversity series, Lady Quark and her husband, Lord Volt, appear as residents of Earth 48 of The New 52 's modified DC Multiverse. According to subsequent information, this iteration of Earth-48 is a fusion of the Pre-Crisis Earth-Six and Warworld (52 's Earth-48). Lady Quark, Lord Volt and their daughter Liana are members of Earth 48's royal family, much as they were on Earth-Six.

Infinite Frontier

Powers and abilities
Lady Quark is a metahuman with the ability to absorb and emit nuclear energies.  She can direct these energies as percussive forces from her body. Her powers allow her to fly and travel through space. If her unexplained reappearance is taken as is, it may be assumed she can regenerate herself even from seeming death.

Other versions
An older version of Lady Quark becomes one-half of the tyrannical ruler of L.E.G.I.O.N.

Lady Quark is featured-along with Lord Volt in a Convergence tie-in, fighting Matrix-Supergirl. Her daughter, Princess Fern, is featured in another Convergence tie-in, fighting Parallax. Fern's parents are seen on Monitor screens.

External links
Lady Quark profile - The Unofficial Guide to the DC Universe

References

Comics characters introduced in 1985
DC Comics female superheroes
DC Comics superheroes
Fictional royalty
Characters created by Marv Wolfman
Characters created by George Pérez
DC Comics metahumans